Young Harris is a city in Towns County, Georgia, United States. The population was 899 at the 2010 census. Young Harris is home to Young Harris College, after which it was named.

Geography
Young Harris is located at  (34.934233, -83.847681).

The city is located at the junction of U.S. Route 76/Georgia State Route 515 (Zell Miller Mountain Parkway) and Georgia State Route 66. U.S. 76/GA-515 run through the center of town from west to east, with GA-515 splitting off to the north in the eastern part of the city from U.S. 76. U.S. 76 leads east  to Hiawassee, the Towns County seat, and southwest (with GA-515)  to Blairsville. GA-66 leads northwest from Young Harris  to its end at the Georgia-North Carolina state line.

According to the United States Census Bureau, the city has a total area of 1.0 square mile (2.6 km), all land.

Adjacent cities
These are cities within an approximate 15 mile radius of Young Harris.

Demographics

As of the 2010 United States Census, there were 899 people living in the city. The racial makeup of the city was 90.9% White, 2.6% Black, 0.4% Native American, 1.2% Asian, 0.1% from some other race and 0.8% from two or more races. 4.0% were Hispanic or Latino of any race.

As of the census of 2000, there were 604 people, 112 households, and 74 families living in the city. The racial makeup of the city was 96.52% White, 1.66% African American, 0.33% Native American, 0.50% Asian, and 0.99% from two or more races. Hispanic or Latino of any race were 0.83% of the population.

There were 112 households, out of which 21.4% had children under the age of 18 living with them, 55.4% were married couples living together, 8.0% had a female householder with no husband present, and 33.9% were non-families. 32.1% of all households were made up of individuals, and 17.9% had someone living alone who was 65 years of age or older. The average household size was 2.19 and the average family size was 2.74.

In the city the population was spread out, with 8.6% under the age of 18, 62.6% from 18 to 24, 8.9% from 25 to 44, 11.6% from 45 to 64, and 8.3% who were 65 years of age or older. The median age was 20 years. For every 100 females, there were 69.69 males.  For every 100 females age 18 and over, there were 67.3 males.

The median income for a household in the city was $38,250, and the median income for a family was $46,071. Males had a median income of $35,313 versus $40,625 for females. The per capita income for the city was $12,533. About 6.3% of families and 10.7% of the population were below the poverty line, including 2.5% of those under age 18 and 18.8% of those age 65 or over.

History 
Young Harris was originally named "McTyeire", after Bishop Holland McTyeire. It was later renamed to honor Judge Young Harris, the benefactor of McTyeire Institute (which was also renamed to Young Harris College).

Notable people
Former Georgia governor and U.S. Senator Zell Miller (1932-2018) was born in and died in Young Harris. He was mayor of the small town from 1959 to 1960.
Former Member of the United States House of Representatives from Georgia's 9th District Ed Jenkins (1933-2012) was born in Young Harris.

See also
Brasstown Valley Resort

References

External links
http://www.youngharrisga.net/

Cities in Georgia (U.S. state)
Cities in Towns County, Georgia